Norway competed at the 1952 Summer Olympics in Helsinki, Finland. 102 competitors, 96 men and 6 women, took part in 72 events in 14 sports. Earlier in the year, Norway had hosted the 1952 Winter Olympics in Oslo.

Athletics

Boxing

Canoeing

Cycling

Road Competition
Men's Individual Road Race (190.4 km)
Odd Berg — 5:17:30.2 (→ 24th place)
Erling Kristiansen — 5:11:16.5 (→ 25th place)
Lorang Christiansen — 5:20:01.3 (→ 28th place)

Equestrian

Fencing

Five fencers, all male, represented Norway in 1952.

Men's foil
 Leif Klette

Men's épée
 Johan von Koss
 Egill Knutzen
 Alfred Eriksen

Men's team épée
 Egill Knutzen, Alfred Eriksen, Johan von Koss, Sverre Gillebo

Men's sabre
 Alfred Eriksen

Football

Gymnastics

Rowing

Norway had nine male rowers participate in two out of seven rowing events in 1952.

 Men's coxless four
 Sverre Kråkenes
 Kristoffer Lepsøe
 Thorstein Kråkenes
 Harald Kråkenes

 Men's coxed four
 Bjørn Christoffersen
 Arnfinn Larsen
 Wilhelm Hayden
 Thor Nilsen
 Leif Andersen (cox)

Sailing

Shooting

Nine shooters represented Norway in 1952. Erling Kongshaug won gold in the 50 m rifle, three positions and John H. Larsen, Sr. won gold in the 100m running deer.

25 m pistol
 Gunnar Svendsen
 Oddvar Wenner Nilssen

50 m pistol
 Gunnar Svendsen
 Rolf Klementsen

300 m rifle, three positions
 Erling Kongshaug
 Mauritz Amundsen

50 m rifle, three positions
 Erling Kongshaug
 Mauritz Amundsen

50 m rifle, prone
 Erling Kongshaug
 Mauritz Amundsen

100m running deer
 John H. Larsen, Sr.
 Rolf Bergersen

Trap
 Hans Aasnæs
 Svein Helling

Swimming

Weightlifting

Wrestling

References

External links
Official Olympic Reports
International Olympic Committee results database

Nations at the 1952 Summer Olympics
1952
1952 in Norwegian sport